The AP small college football rankings was a system used by the Associated Press (AP) from 1960 to 1974 to rank the best small college football teams in the United States.

The United Press International led the way with its UPI small college football rankings starting in 1958.  The AP followed with its own small-college rankings starting in October 1960.  The AP rankings were issued weekly and were based on ballots cast by an AP board of experts, consisting of one person in each of eight NCAA district.

Top teams in final polls
The following chart lists the top five teams in the final AP small college rankings for each year from 1960 to 1974. The figures in brackets reflect the number of first-place votes received in the final voting.  The figures in parenthesis reflect the total points received.

References

College football rankings
Small college football rankings